Geographical kaleidoscope   is a popular scientific book written by Petro Kravchuk and published in 1988 (Kiev).

The book discusses "champions" of the Earth and its earliest explorers.

External links
 Soviet School 
  “Geographical kaleidoscope” 
 Географический калейдоскоп 

1988 non-fiction books
Ukrainian books